Pine Flat Dam is a concrete gravity dam on the Kings River in the Central Valley of Fresno County, California United States. The dam's primary purpose is flood control, with irrigation, hydroelectric power generation and recreation secondary in importance.

The dam was built by the U.S. Army Corps of Engineers (USACE) after a six-year controversy between supporters of irrigation development and proponents of flood control. Construction began in 1947 and was completed in 1954. Since then, the dam has prevented millions of dollars in flood damages and fostered extensive development of agriculture on the fertile floodplain of the Kings River; after 1984 it has also generated hydroelectricity. However, the increased irrigation allowed by the dam has also led to the destruction of some of North America's most extensive wetland habitats.

History

Background
The first serious proposal to dam the Kings River was made in the 1890s by engineer J.B. Lippincott, who surveyed and envisioned the development of a  reservoir on the river. In 1937, the KRWA appealed to the federal government to provide financial aid and support the construction of a large dam at Pine Flat.

Starting in 1938, two government agencies – the USACE and the U.S. Bureau of Reclamation (USBR) – fought it out for the construction of Pine Flat Dam. With the support of President Franklin D. Roosevelt, the USBR wanted to incorporate the dam as part of its fledgling Central Valley Project (CVP), which intended to develop the rivers of the Central Valley for irrigation. The USACE objected to the bureau's plans, mainly because the primary purpose of the dam would be flood control. All of the water in the Kings River was already appropriated to local irrigators, many of whom owned more land than the USBR limit.

Pre-construction controversies
By 1940 the water users of the Kings River were leaning towards letting the USACE build the dam, in light of the continual water-rights problems associated with the USBR's plans, in addition to full federal funding offered by the USACE. The Flood Control Act of 1944 cemented this decision, authorizing the construction of four dams in the Tulare Lake basin of the San Joaquin Valley – Pine Flat, Terminus, Success and Isabella – as a USACE undertaking. The president signed a bill appropriating preliminary funds for Pine Flat Dam on April 2, 1945, but only "reluctantly" and "[with the emphasis] that he'd try to avoid dispensing any more money to the army for the dam". Roosevelt planned to take the Pine Flat issue to Congress, but never got the chance – he died of a brain hemorrhage just ten days later at his home in Georgia.

Unfortunately for the USACE, Roosevelt's successor, Harry S. Truman, was also adamant that Pine Flat Dam be built for irrigation. Truman impounded the initial funds for the dam's construction and promised not to release it until the USACE and USBR could reach an agreement on the proportions of funding that would go to irrigation and flood control. To further complicate the situation, Truman insisted that the USBR negotiate the contracts for irrigation water from Pine Flat Dam with KRWA farmers. In a last-ditch effort to secure the Pine Flat project, the USBR revoked its acreage limit from the entirety of the Kings River service area and the Tulare Lake bed. After two years of legal battles, the share of project cost devoted to irrigation was settled at $14.25 million, less than half of the dam's $33.5 million price tag. On February 18, 1947, the president released the funds, finally allowing construction on Pine Flat Dam to begin.

Construction
On May 27, 1947, the USACE held the groundbreaking ceremony for Pine Flat Dam, which was attended by more than 2,000 people. Governor Earl Warren set off the first blast at the dam site with the turn of a switch, detonating forty charges of dynamite on the south side of the Kings River gorge. In order to bring construction materials to the site, a temporary railroad was constructed along the Kings River. In November 1950, floodwaters tore through the construction site, contributing to a serious late-season flood event that caused $20–25 million of damage in the San Joaquin Valley. This was the last major flood event on the Kings River before the completion of Pine Flat Dam, which would have "prevented much damage… had [it] been completed".

In 1951, a cofferdam was constructed to divert the Kings River along the north side of the canyon to allow the construction of the dam's foundations. In July, the river was blocked from this temporary channel and flowed through the dam's bottom sluice gates for the first time, permitting the northern section of the dam to be built in the former diversion channel. Pine Flat Dam's main structure was built in 37 vertical sections of large concrete forms or "monoliths" that were secured by temporary steel scaffolding that was removed after the concrete cured.

By 1953, the dam was high enough to begin impounding the river and flows through the sluice gates were cut, and Pine Flat Lake began to fill. The final cost of Pine Flat Dam was $42.3 million, exceeding the projected cost by more than 25 percent. On May 22, 1954, 3,000 people attended the dedication of Pine Flat Dam. This was far short of the predicted crowd of 15,000. Because of the conflict between local farmers, the USACE and the USBR, "perhaps more citizens would have been present if they had felt that it was really their dam, that they had more to celebrate."

Post-construction events

In January 1969, the highest releases ever from Pine Flat Dam, occurred in the wake of a flood that reached a less impressive peak of  but had a much greater volume than the 1955 rain flood. The dam's contribution to reducing the impact of floods has allowed greater diversion of Kings River flows for irrigation, and along with other smaller dams in the southern San Joaquin Valley, has contributed to the desiccation of the once-expansive wetlands of Tulare Lake.

During the 1969 rains local residents clamored for floodwaters from Pine Flat Lake to be diverted to Tulare lakebed.  Representation on the irrigation district board, however, was determined by the value of landowners’ land and J. G. Boswell Company owned the majority of land in the district.  J. G. Boswell Co. voted to block the floodwater diversion so that its crops on the Buena Vista lakebed would not be destroyed.

Residents whose homes were destroyed by the flood sued.  Limiting suffrage to landowners violated the one man, one vote guarantee in the U.S. Constitution, they alleged, because the irrigation district can levy taxes, exercise eminent domain, and decide whose land gets flooded.  In 1973 a divided United States Supreme Court disagreed, finding that a private company can exercise control of the irrigation district because flood control is not an important government function.

In the early 1970s, the KRCD (Kings River Conservation District) proposed a system of new dams and power plants to further develop the water resources of the Kings River watershed. These included a new power station at Pine Flat Dam, a massive  dam at Rodgers Crossing upstream of Pine Flat Lake and a reservoir at Piedra to regulate Pine Flat Dam releases. The only part of the project to be completed was the Jeff L. Taylor Pine Flat Power Plant at the base of Pine Flat Dam, which went into operation in 1984.

Following the September 11, 2001 terrorist attacks in New York City, Pine Flat Dam was closed to all public access because of its importance in protecting the region from floods and the damage that the impounded water would do if the dam was breached.

Design and operations
The dam's hydroelectric power station contains three 55 megawatt (MW) Francis turbines with a combined capacity of 165 MW. The plant produces about 420 million kilowatt hours (KWh) annually, enough to supply the needs of about 47,000 households.

Due to the limited capacity of the reservoir, dam operators are often forced to release flows that exceed this limit in high runoff years, including in 1969, 1978, and 1986. In the 1969 floods,  of water – greater than the entire capacity of Pine Flat Lake – poured over the dam's spillway. Increasing the height of the dam would also allow for development of more water resources for irrigation and greater power generation.

The dam is also operated to maintain base flows in the Kings River during low water summers for wildlife conservation purposes.

See also

Pine Flat Lake
Kings River (California)
U.S. Army Corps of Engineers
List of dams and reservoirs in California
List of largest reservoirs of California
List of power stations in California
List of the tallest dams in the United States

References

Works cited

External links 
 U.S. Army Corps of Engineers, Pine Flat Lake and Dam
 Kings River Conservation District
 Past month flow report for Pine Flat reservoir

Dams in California
Dams in the Tulare Basin
Kings River (California)
San Joaquin Valley
Buildings and structures in Fresno County, California
Gravity dams
United States Army Corps of Engineers dams
Hydroelectric power plants in California
Dams completed in 1954
Energy infrastructure completed in 1954